Shotgun email refers to an email requesting information or action that only requires the efforts of one person but is sent to multiple people in an effort to guarantee that at least one person will respond. The shotgun email often results in multiple people responding to something already accomplished and therefore results in a loss of overall productivity. Shotgun emailing is considered poor internet etiquette.

An example would be a person of authority in a business organization sending out an email to five technicians in the information technology department of his company to let them know his printer is broken. One technician responds with an on-site call and fixes the problem. Later in the day, other technicians follow-up to fix the printer that is already back in order. Shotgun emails can also be request for information or other tasks.

The blind shotgun email occurs when the sender uses the blind co-copy feature of an email program to hide the fact that a shotgun email is in use. This is considered particularly deceitful.

Shotgun emails are also considered to be Shotgun email marketing, in which companies which is mostly related to sending newsletter information, sometimes supporting missions on helping the poor and such messages like that.

But what is most reported is that scam emails use the method of Shotgun emails, as one must have approached to, such as winning lottery's, getting free trips to countries while you didn't sign up for and many others like that, to get access of what you are doing.

See also
Email spam
Netiquette

Email
Internet terminology
Etiquette